Ýaňyl Kawisowa (born 1 January 1997) is a Turkmenistan female Muaythai practitioner. She was also a karate practitioner (karateka) before becoming a professional Muay Thai practitioner. 

Ýaňyl competed at the 2016 Asian Beach Games and clinched a bronze medal in the women's 54-57kg featherweight event. In the same year, she took part in the IFMA Muay Thai World Cup and secured a silver medal in the women's featherweight event. Ýaňyl Kawisowa represented Turkmenistan at the 2017 Asian Indoor and Martial Arts Games and claimed a silver medal in the women's 54kg event and eventually Turkmenistan was placed first according to the number of medals at the multi-sport event.

References

External links 
Profile Ashgabat 2017

1997 births
Living people
Turkmenistan Muay Thai practitioners
Turkmenistan female karateka